Finlandia, Op. 26, is a tone poem by the Finnish composer Jean Sibelius. It was written in 1899 and revised in 1900.  The piece was composed for the Press Celebrations of 1899, a covert protest against increasing censorship from the Russian Empire, and was the last of seven pieces performed as an accompaniment to a tableau depicting episodes from Finnish history. The premiere was on 2 July 1900 in Helsinki with the Helsinki Philharmonic Society conducted by Robert Kajanus. A typical performance takes between 7½ and 9 minutes depending on how it is performed.

In order to avoid Russian censorship, Finlandia had to be performed under alternative names at various musical concerts. Titles under which the piece masqueraded were numerous and often confusing —famous examples include Happy Feelings at the awakening of Finnish Spring, and A Scandinavian Choral March. According to Finland's tourism website, "While Finland was still a Grand Duchy under Russia performances within the empire had to take place under the covert title of 'Impromptu'."

Most of the piece is taken up with rousing and turbulent music, evoking the national struggle of the Finnish people. Towards the end, a calm comes over the orchestra, and the serene and melodic Finlandia Hymn is heard.  Often incorrectly cited as a traditional folk melody, the Hymn section is of Sibelius' own creation.

Although he initially composed it for orchestra, in 1900 Sibelius arranged the work for solo piano.

Sibelius later reworked the Finlandia Hymn into a stand-alone piece.  This hymn, with words written in 1941 by Veikko Antero Koskenniemi, is one of the most important national songs of Finland. It has been repeatedly suggested to be the official national anthem of Finland. Today, during modern performances of the full-length Finlandia, a choir is sometimes involved, singing the Finnish lyrics with the hymn section.

With different words, it is also sung as a Christian hymn (I Sought The Lord, And Afterward I Knew; Be Still, My Soul, When Memory Fades, Hail, Festal Day, in Italian evangelical churches: Veglia al mattino), and was the national anthem of the short-lived African state of Biafra (Land of the Rising Sun). In Wales the tune is used for Lewis Valentine's patriotic hymn Gweddi Dros Gymru (A Prayer for Wales).

Instrumentation
The tone poem is scored for large orchestra, consisting of the following:

Woodwinds 2 flutes, 2 oboes, 2 B clarinets, 2 bassoons 
Brass 4 horns, 3 trumpets, 3 trombones, tuba
Percussion timpani, bass drum, cymbals, triangle
Strings 1st violins, 2nd violins, violas, cellos, double basses

Press Celebrations Music 
As with the Karelia Suite, the original Press Celebrations Music suite was never originally released under Sibelius' supervision, but after almost 99 years with the sheet music untouched, the suite was reconstructed and released on two different CDs, the first one by the Tampere Philharmonic Orchestra in 1998, conducted by Tuomas Ollila, and the second by the Lahti Symphony Orchestra in 2000, conducted by Osmo Vänskä.

The last two movements of the suite were reworked to become Finlandia.

The original movements are as follows.
Preludium: Andante (ma non troppo)
Tableau 1: The Song of 
Tableau 2: The Finns are Baptized by Bishop Henry
Tableau 3: Scene from Duke Johan's Court
Tableau 4: The Finns in the Thirty Years' War
Tableau 5: The Great Hostility
Tableau 6: Finland Awakes

References

Further reading
Hepokoski, James (2004). "Finlandia awakens." In Daniel M. Grimley, ed., The Cambridge Companion to Sibelius (Cambridge University Press), pp. 81–94.

External links 
 
 Full score of a number of Sibelius's tone poems, including this piece
 2012 YouTube video recording of Finlandia Op. 26 by Jean Sibelius

Symphonic poems by Jean Sibelius
1900 compositions
National symbols of Finland
Compositions in A-flat major